Hotel Sessions is an unofficial limited edition tour EP released by Lydia. It features 4 songs acoustically re-recorded from their first album This December; It's One More and I'm Free. The EP was handmade and sold at shows. There is no official cover art, as it was merely a CD-R demo.

Release 
Singer Mindy White posted a blog detailing the making of the EP:"I know you guys are eager to hear it…. & we are excited as well. But some are more stoked to find it online to download it. I know it’s hard to get it if we aren’t playing your city ..but here’s the story behind the “Hotel Sessions”. We had over $1200 dollars stolen from us on this tour. It’s been a struggle with trying to make gas to each show & all. We knew we had to do something to makeup for the money stolen. The only idea we had was to sell exclusive songs only available FROM US. They’re legitimately recorded in the hotels & in the van on drives. It does suck to know that the songs will probably leak, which will enable some people to get them without buying them at shows. So if you can come out and actually get them from us, that’d be amazing. There it is in a nut shell. Hope you guys enjoy em."

Track listing

References

2009 EPs
Lydia (band) albums